Dickhead or dick head is an informal term for the glans penis. It may also refer to:
 A common insult
 Dickheads (brand), were an Australian brand of matches
 Henry Richard "Dick" Head (1887–1940), Australian rules football player
 "Dickhead", song by Robbie Williams from the 2006 album Rudebox
 "Dickhead", song by Kate Nash from the 2007 album Made of Bricks

See also
 Richard Head (disambiguation), "Dick" being a diminutive for Richard